The Nuestra Señora de la Annunciata Parish Church, also known as Bosoboso Church or Boso-Boso Church, is a Roman Catholic parish church located in Sitio Old Boso-Boso, Barangay San Jose in Antipolo, Rizal, Philippines.

History 
The first church was built as a mission church by the Franciscans in 1669. Originally, it served the Dumagat people of Lanatin and Linotan in the mountains of modern-day Rizal province. The Jesuits eventually took over the mission and the church in 1741. It was turned over to secular priests in 1768 when the Jesuits were expelled from the Philippines and other Spanish realms.

In 1880, an earthquake caused significant damage to the church. Owing to the dwindling population in the area, the damaged portions of the church were not rebuilt.

In 1930, the Americans planned to build a dam in the surrounding area, and the remaining inhabitants were ordered to resettle elsewhere. The project was eventually abandoned due to a discovered fault in the region, yet people did not return until the time of the Japanese Occupation. Whatever remained of the structure was subsequently razed to the ground by the Japanese, leaving only the lower portion of the original façade intact.

As the area was eventually resettled, administration of the parish was taken over by the Camillian Order in 1986, who helped organize rebuilding of the church. The restoration was completed in 1995, preserving the ruins of the façade, with the new portions built as close as possible to the simple, sparse architecture of the original.

Gallery

References 

Roman Catholic churches in Rizal
Buildings and structures in Antipolo
Churches in the Roman Catholic Diocese of Antipolo